Yo Te Pido Amor is the sixth album by Mexican pop singer Yuri, released on November 21, 1985 by EMI Music. It was her first album for the label.

Critical reception
The album was nominated to the Grammy Awards for Best Latin Pop Performance, among José Feliciano, Pandora, Danny Rivera and José José, losing to "Le Lo Lai" by Feliciano. Yo Te Pido Amor sold 600,000 units..

Track listing

Production 
 Executive producer: Miguel Blasco
 Director: Gian Pietro Felisatti
 Musical Arrangements: Gian Pietro Felisatti, Noah-Santapaga
 String Arrangements: Gian Pietro Felisatti, Jesus Gluck, Eduardo Leyva
 Recording Studio: Eurosonic (Madrid) and Baby Studios (Milan)
 Sound engineer: Massimo Noé and J. Alvarez Alija
 Assistant: Alberto Pinto
 Musicians: Lele Melotti (Drums), Pino Santapaga (Guitar), Luigi Capellot (Bass), Piero Cairo (Keyboards)
 Photography: Serapio Carreño
 Graphic design: ZEN
 Stylist: Cheska

Singles
 "Yo te pido amor"
 "Dame un beso"
 "Déjala"
 "El amor es un boomerang"
 "Te quiero"

Single Charts

References

1985 albums
Yuri (Mexican singer) albums